Grant Snider is an American cartoonist, comic strip artist, writer and orthodontist.

Life and career 
Snider grew up in Derby, Kansas, with his twin brother, Gavin, also an illustrator. He studied engineering at the University of Kansas, and then dentistry at the University of Missouri-Kansas City. He drew strips for both college newspapers: the University Daily Kansan and The University News; for that work he won the Charles M. Schultz Award for Cartooning in 2008.

Later that year he drew the strip Delayed Karma for the Kansas City Star and in 2009 he launched his online Incidental Comics, featuring strips about art, literature and the creative process. His strips have been featured in magazines such as The New York Review of Books and The New York Times Magazine and compiled in two books: The Shape of Ideas (2018) and I Will Judge You by Your Bookshelf (2020), the latter a collection of comics about the love of writing and reading.

Snider also is the author of children's picture books What Color is Night (2019) and What Sound is Morning (2020).

References

External links
Official webpage
Incidental Comics
Interview on Substack , covered by journalist or contributor Rishabh Chaddha

Living people
American cartoonists
American children's book illustrators
People from Derby, Kansas
University of Missouri–Kansas City alumni
Year of birth missing (living people)